Photography and Photographic may refer to:
Photography, the art and science of creating photographic images
Photography, a 1973 Hungarian film
"Photographic" is a song by Depeche Mode on their album Speak & Spell

See also
Fotografia (disambiguation)